Salum Abubakar (born 26 August 1992) is a Tanzanian professional footballer who plays as a midfielder for Tanzanian Premier League club Young Africans and the Tanzania national team.

International career

International goals
Scores and results list Tanzania's goal tally first.

References

External links 
 

1992 births
Living people
Tanzanian footballers
Tanzania international footballers
Association football midfielders